The Battle of Cassano d'Adda was fought on 27 April 1799 near Cassano d'Adda, about  ENE of Milan. It resulted in a victory for the Austrians and Russians under Alexander Suvorov over Jean Moreau's French army. The action took place during the War of the Second Coalition during the larger conflict known as the French Revolutionary Wars.

Background

While General Napoleon Bonaparte campaigned in Egypt, the Second Coalition launched an invasion of French-occupied Italy. General of Division (MG) Barthélemy Schérer fought inconclusive actions the Austrians at Pastrengo, Verona, and Legnago on 26 March 1799. Feldmarschal-Leutnant (FML) Pál Kray and his Austrians then defeated Schérer at the Battle of Magnano on April 4. This defeat forced the French army into a long retreat. Attempts by Schérer to hold the lines of the Mincio and Oglio rivers failed when an Austrian force led by FML Josef Vukassovich turned his northern flank. Schérer, completely out of his depth, handed over army command to the more capable MG Moreau. Austria's Russian allies, led by Suvorov, soon began appearing at the front.

When Field Marshal Suvorov joined the allied army, he took over the top command from Kray, though the latter had just been promoted to Feldzeugmeister. The arrival of General of Cavalry Michael von Melas displaced Kray the top Austrian field command. Therefore, Kray was assigned to capture the fortress of Mantua, while Melas and Suvorov pursued the French. The Siege of Mantua lasted from April until the garrison surrendered on 28 July.

Battle
Moreau deployed the divisions of MGs Paul Grenier, Claude Victor, Jean Sérurier, and Pierre de Laboissière to defend the line of the Adda River. The Austrians still made up the bulk of the allied army, since only three formations of Cossacks were present. The Austrian division commanders were FML Peter Ott, FML Johann Zoph, General-Major Franz de Lusignan (acting commander for FML Michael Fröhlich), and FML Konrad Valentin von Kaim. Even before the battle, a Russian force under Petr Bagration outflanked the French position by seizing a bridge over the Adda at Lecco on 26 April. This put Sérurier's division in an awkward position. On 27 April, General of Cavalry Michael von Melas with the divisions of Fröhlich and Kaim stormed the French positions at Cassano, while Ott and Zoph attacked 6 km farther north at Vaprio d'Adda. Suvorov's assault forced Moreau to retreat.

Results
The French suffered 2,500 killed and wounded, plus 5,000 soldiers, 27 cannon, and 3 colors captured. The Austro-Russians lost 6,000 killed and wounded. Moreau retreated, leaving a 2,400-man garrison in Milan's citadel. On 28 April, Vukassovich trapped Serurier's division at Verderio and the French lost another 300 killed and wounded, plus 2,700 captured. Grenier's division withdrew to Novara while Victor and Laboissière pulled back to Valenza. Another authority gives allied losses as 6,000 and French prisoners as 7,000, without listing French killed and wounded. Perhaps the author includes the losses at Verderio in his total. Kaim pressed on to capture Turin on 20 June. Milan's citadel capitulated on 24 May. The next major action was the Battle of Trebbia (1799) on 17–20 June.

However, the bottom line of this battle was that the Republic of France-created Cisalpine Republic was now back in the hands of the Habsburg monarchy.

Notes

References

External links
The Austrians Advance by Enrico Acerbi
 

Conflicts in 1799
Battles of the French Revolutionary Wars
Battles of the War of the Second Coalition
Battles involving Austria
Battles involving Russia
Battles involving France
1799 in Austria
1799 in France
1799 in Italy
Alexander Suvorov